Dmitry Andreyevich Miroshnichenko  (born 26 February 1992) is a Kazakh footballer who plays as a defender for Russian club Chernomorets Novorossiysk.

Career
In January 2016, Miroshnichenko moved from FC Aktobe to FC Tobol.
On 12 January 2020, Miroshnichenko renewed his contract with Tobol until the end of 2020.

Career statistics

Club

International

Statistics accurate as of match played 18 November 2020

References 

1992 births
Kazakhstani people of Ukrainian descent
People from Aktobe
Living people
Kazakhstani footballers
Association football defenders
Kazakhstan international footballers
FC Kuban Krasnodar players
FC Aktobe players
FC Tobol players
FC Chernomorets Novorossiysk players
Kazakhstan Premier League players
Russian Second League players
Kazakhstani expatriate footballers
Expatriate footballers in Russia
Kazakhstani expatriate sportspeople in Russia